Frank Grant Sawyer (December 14, 1918 – February 19, 1996) was an American politician. He was the 21st Governor of Nevada from 1959 to 1967. He was a member of the Democratic Party.

Early life
Sawyer was born on December 14, 1918, in Twin Falls, Idaho. He was the son of two osteopaths, Harry William and Bula Belle Cameron Sawyer. Sawyer's father was also a state legislator in Nevada.

Sawyer served in the U.S. Army during World War II. He married Bette Norene Hoge on August 1, 1946.

Education
Sawyer attended Linfield College for two years and later enrolled at the University of Nevada, Reno, where he graduated in 1941. While a student at Nevada, Sawyer was a member of the Alpha Tau Omega fraternity.  Sawyer then went to The George Washington University Law School but left to enlist in the army at the beginning of World War II.  After his military service he enrolled at Georgetown University, where he received a law degree in 1946.

Political career
He served as District Attorney for Elko County, Nevada from 1950 to 1958. Sawyer served as the Governor of Nevada from 1959 to 1967. He was defeated in his attempt at a third term by Paul Laxalt.

Governor Sawyer worked to push through civil rights policies and legislation, a difficult process in a state that had been accused of being "the Mississippi of the West."

He was responsible for the development of the modern casino regulatory system with the passage of the Gaming Control Act of 1959 and the formation of the  Nevada Gaming Commission. Sawyer swam against the tide of history when he unsuccessfully fought to prevent corporate ownership over Nevada casinos.

Sawyer was the first western governor to endorse the fledgling presidential campaign of Massachusetts Senator John F. Kennedy in 1960.

Commentators have reflected on Sawyer's career as follows: Grant Sawyer served two turbulent terms as Nevada's governor from 1959 to 1967. Sawyer was an advocate of progressive change. By the late fifties he had come so far from his start in the conservative political machine of Senator Patrick McCarran that many powerful Nevadans considered his policies on education, the environment, and civil rights to be dangerously radical. When he demanded meaningful regulatory control over casino gaming and took decisive action to purge the industry of its mob connections, the establishment's resistance stiffened. Eventually, Sawyer's positions brought him into open conflict with special interests and led to a collision with the justice department of the federal government, but he never backed down.

Later years
In 1967, Sawyer co-founded Lionel Sawyer & Collins.  For many years, this was the largest private law firm in Nevada.  The firm ceased operations on December 31, 2014, with nineteen of its lawyers joining Fennemore Craig.

Sawyer died on February 19, 1996, in Las Vegas, Nevada of complications of a debilitating stroke suffered in 1993, at the age of 77. His wife Bette, a native of Baker City, Oregon, died on September 11, 2002, at the age of 79. They are both interred at the Palm Memorial Park in Las Vegas, Nevada.

Legacy
The following facilities are named for the former governor:
The Grant Sawyer Building, a state office building, located at 555 East Washington Avenue, Las Vegas
Grant Sawyer Middle School, located at 5450 Redwood Street, Las Vegas
The Grant Sawyer Center for Justice Studies, part of the School of Social Research and Justice Studies at the University of Nevada, Reno

References

External links
 Grant Sawyer papers, 97-28. Special Collections, University Libraries, University of Nevada, Reno.
 

|-

|-

1918 births
1996 deaths
Democratic Party governors of Nevada
District attorneys in Nevada
George Washington University Law School alumni
Georgetown University Law Center alumni
Linfield University alumni
Military personnel from Idaho
Military personnel from Nevada
People from Twin Falls, Idaho
United States Army soldiers
University of Nevada, Reno alumni
20th-century American lawyers
20th-century American politicians
United States Army personnel of World War II